Alfvén may refer to:

People
 Hannes Alfvén (1908–1995), Swedish plasma physicist and Nobel Prize in Physics laureate
 Hugo Alfvén (1872–1960), Swedish composer, conductor, violinist, and painter
 Marie Triepcke Krøyer Alfvén (1867–1940), commonly known as Marie Krøyer, Danish painter, wife of Hugo

Other
 Alfvén wave, a type of magnetohydrodynamic wave, named after Hannes Alfvén
 1778 Alfvén, an asteroid discovered in 1960, named after Hannes Alfvén